The Grantham–Skegness line, originally promoted as the "Poacher Line", runs for  between Grantham and Skegness in Lincolnshire, England. Trains on this route originate from Nottingham via the Nottingham to Grantham Line as an hourly through service from Nottingham to Skegness, with slower stopping services at peak times.  The line is operated by East Midlands Railway British Rail Class 156 "Super-Sprinter", British Rail Class 170 "Turbostar" and British Rail Class 158 "Sprinter Express" diesel multiple units.

Community rail
The route was selected as one of the seven pilot schemes under the Department for Transport's Community Rail Development Strategy in 2005 and was formally designated as a community rail service in July 2006. Passenger use of the line has grown since becoming a community rail line and the Poacher Line Community Rail Partnership actively promotes the route through marketing promotions, ticketing offers, music trains and guided walks. Redundant space at stations at Sleaford and Boston is being brought back into community use.  Members of the Partnership include Lincolnshire County Council, East Midlands Railway, Association of Community Rail Partnerships and Network Rail.
Given the natural flows along it made sense to extend the Partnership to Nottingham. Nottinghamshire County Council was invited to join the partnership and became full members in 2007.

Route

The route is a community rail line. In November 2005 it was reported that the section between Boston and Skegness was unable to take heavier trains although work to enhance the track took place during winter 2009/10. These were singled in the early 1980s to reduce track maintenance costs.

Trains and train crews operating the Poacher Line are based at Boston and Nottingham.
Nottingham to Skegness takes between 1 hour 50 minutes and 2 hours 15 minutes. A couple of express Skegness-Sleaford-Nottingham trains run avoiding Grantham, these also call at Wainfleet, Boston, Heckington & Bingham. The last evening train at 9pm from Skegness is an express to Nottingham avoiding Grantham.
Grantham to Skegness takes about 1 hour 30 minutes on the Poacher Line.  The reference is to the traditional song  Lincolnshire Poacher.

As well as providing the only rail service for Boston and Skegness the line also provides the most frequent and reliable service from Sleaford to reach London. Sleaford can be accessed by a second route (the Peterborough to Lincoln Line), however this has services which do not run late at night nor on Sundays. In 2007, Central Trains, the then operator, announced that longer trains would be used on the line as overcrowding at weekends has become a severe problem.

East Midlands Trains took over the operation of all routes in the East Midlands in November 2007 and have in the past expressed an interest in running London –  trains on summer Saturdays. This has been delayed by Network Rail putting back the track repairs between Boston and Skegness to 2010.

History
The East Lincolnshire Railway from Boston to Louth opened in March 1848, and the section from Grantham to Boston was built by the Boston, Sleaford and Midland Counties Railway, opening in two stages in 1857 and 1859. In due course both concerns were leased and later absorbed by the GNR company. The section from Wainfleet to Skegness opened in August 1873 (by the Wainfleet and Firsby Railway Company, later owned by the GNR in the late 1890s). The GNR became part of the LNER in 1923.  When other nearby lines were still open it became a less important route, except for its section from Boston to Firsby which was shared with the more important Peterborough to Grimsby line (via ) until October 1970 - this resulted in the line's unusually sharp curve in the track near Firsby where it joins the Skegness line (which was originally opened as a branch from Firsby). This also had a section from here to Woodhall Spa and on to Lincoln. There had never been a direct line built from Skegness to Mablethorpe; travellers to Mablethorpe would have to travel via either the branch line from Willoughby (from the south which opened in October 1886), or Louth (from the north which opened in September 1888).

The Skegness part of the line inspired the famous poster, designed in 1908 for the GNR.

Allington Chord
When part of the line was shared with the East Coast Main Line, there was a common bottleneck on the three miles north of Grantham to the Barkston South junction, which held up valuable slots on a more important route. A solution was urgently needed to get the Skegness trains off this route. In October 2005, trains heading for Skegness were diverted back towards Nottingham as far as Allington junction, a new £11 million short section of track, which was built to allow trains to head on to the Grantham Avoiding Line. This has increased reliability at the expense of a slightly increased standard (but non-halted) journey time.

References

Further reading

External links
 Poacher Line website
 Allington Chord
 Opening of Allington Chord
 Information at the DfT
 Musical trains
 South East Lincolnshire Traveller's Association
 Train Spotting World
 Association of Community Rail Partnerships
 East Midlands Trains promotion

Community railway lines in England
Grantham
Rail transport in Lincolnshire
Railway lines in the East Midlands
Skegness
Standard gauge railways in England